Anthea Sylbert (born October 6, 1939) is an American film producer and costume designer, who was active during the "modern era" of American film. She was nominated twice for Academy Awards for Best Costume Design, first at the 47th Academy Awards for Chinatown (1974), and then at the 50th Academy Awards for her work on Julia (1977). In addition, she has more than ten credits as producer or executive producer, including for such works as CrissCross (1991) and the television film Truman (1995), the latter of which earned Sylbert an Emmy. At the 7th Annual Costume Designers Guild Awards in 2005, Sylbert was an honoree, receiving the Lacoste Career Achievement award for film.

Biography

Early life and education
Anthea Sylbert was born Anthea Gianna Kouros in Brooklyn, New York, on October 6, 1939, to what has been described as a "close-knit Greek family". She was interested in artistic activities as a child, and is reported to have learned to sew from a grandmother. Kouros studied art at Barnard College.

Career

Following her long period of costume design work, Sylbert took on executive production management roles at the vice president level, first at Warner Borothers, then at United Artists, where she was known, in particular, for her skills at conflict resolution when filmmakers were at odds with the studios. After this period, she began a deep partnership with Goldie Hawn, beginning with the film Private Benjamin (1980). Ultimately, the two of them created the Hawn/Sylvebert Movie Company, which produced a number of films, including Protocol (1984) and Something to Talk About (1995).

Filmography
The following is Anthea Sylbert's list of credits, primarily as reported by the British Film Institute.

Producing
 1999, If You Believe
 1998, Giving up the Ghost (teleplay)
 1997, Hope
 1995, Truman
 1995, Something to Talk About
 1991, Deceived
 1991, Crisscross
 1990, My Blue Heaven
 1987, Overboard
 1986, Wildcats
 1984, Protocol

Costumes and costume design
 1978, F.I.S.T.
 1977, Julia
 1976, The Last Tycoon
 1976, King Kong
 1975, Shampoo
 1974, Chinatown
 1974, The Fortune
 1972, Bad Company
 1971, The Cowboys
 1971, Carnal Knowledge
 1969, The Illustrated Man
 1968, Rosemary's Baby

Other credits
 2008, Roman Polanski: Wanted and Desired, on-screen participant
 1999, If You Believe, writer, with Richard Romanus
 1976, Mikey and Nicky, visual consultant

Work on Chinatown

Sylbert worked with Chinatown (1974) from its early days after her brother-in-law Richard Sylbert introduced and recommended her to director Roman Polanski. Sylbert was affectionately know in that close-working, small group of accomplished film-makers as Ant for her penchant for "stringently straight" dark skirts and black turtlenecks. Sylbert was known to be "utterly unafraid to speak truth, no matter how ugly, to anyone, no matter how powerful". Her work was described as breaking with past in its aim at being, "not for beauty or for chic", but rather "to amplify character". Sylbert was nominated for the 1975 Academy Award for Best Costume Design for her work on the film.

Work on Julia

Sylbert was nominated for the 1978 Academy Award for Best Costume Design for her work on the film Julia (1977).

Awards and recognition
In addition to the 1975 and 1978 Academy Award nominations for best costume design, Sylbert won an Emmy for her production of Truman (1995). In 1999, Sylbert and Richard Romanus were nominated for Best Original Screenplay by the Writers Guild of America for the Christmas film If You Believe. Sylbert was an honoree at the 7th Annual Costume Designers Guild Awards (in 2005), where she received the Lacoste Career Achievement award for film.

Personal life

Sylbert has been married to actor and writer Richard Romanus since August 11, 1985. In 2004, Sylbert and Romanus moved to the Greek island of Skiathos.

References

Additional reading

External links

1939 births
Living people
American costume designers
Artists from New York City
Emmy Award winners